The 5165 National Conservative Movement Party is an Armenian political party. It was founded on 22 April 2021 and is currently led by Karin Tonoyan.

History
The 5165 National Conservative Movement Party was founded in April 2021 and Karin Tonoyan was elected chairwoman of the party. The number within the name of the party represents the height of Mount Ararat. The party announced its intentions to participate in the 2021 Armenian parliamentary election. Following the election, the party won 1.22% of the popular vote, failing to win any seats in the National Assembly. Currently, the party acts as an extra-parliamentary force.

Ideology
The party supports increasing the security of the country, developing a stronger military, healthcare reform, strengthening the economy, encouraging the repatriation of the Armenian Diaspora, and supporting independence for Artsakh.

Electoral record

Parliamentary elections

See also

 Programs of political parties in Armenia

References

External links 
 5165 National Conservative Movement Party on Facebook

Political parties established in 2021
Political parties in Armenia